Kevin Krauter is a non-binary American singer, songwriter, multi-instrumentalist and musician. Krauter was a founding member of the indie pop group Hoops until their hiatus was announced in 2018. In 2018, Krauter released his debut solo album, Toss Up. In 2020, Krauter released his second solo album, Full Hand.

Career 
Krauter formed Hoops with school friends Drew Auscherman, Keagan Beresford, and James Harris in 2014. The next year he released his debut solo EP, Magnolia via Winspear.

Hoops released three "tapes", one EP and two albums before announcing their hiatus in 2018. On November 12, 2019, Hoops released a single, "They Say", their first since 2017.

In 2016, Krauter released "Fantasy Theme".

Krauter released his sophomore album "Full Hand" on February 29, 2020, via Bayonet Records. Prior to album release, Krauter released 4 singles - Pretty Boy, Surprise, Green Eyes, and Opportunity.

Since the hiatus of Hoops, Krauter has toured as a solo artist with Unknown Mortal Orchestra, The Marías, Triathlon, Beach Fossils, Soccer Mommy, Hovvdy, and others. Krauter also contributed a song to Bernie Speaks with the Community, a benefit compilation produced to raise money for the Bernie Sanders 2020 presidential campaign.

Personal life 
A native of Indiana, Krauter attended Herron High School in Indianapolis before attending Ball State University, where he studied communications. Krauter left college before his senior year to focus on his music career.

Krauter uses he/they pronouns.

References 

American indie rock musicians
Musicians from Indiana
American indie pop musicians
Shoegaze musicians
Living people
Year of birth missing (living people)
Non-binary musicians